René Hauss (25 December 1927 – 6 December 2010) was a French football defender and coach.

He spent his entire playing career with RC Strasbourg.

After his playing career, he became a coach with RC Strasbourg and Standard de Liège.

References

External links
Profile retrieved 8 December 2010

1927 births
2010 deaths
French people of German descent
Association football defenders
French footballers
RC Strasbourg Alsace players
Ligue 1 players
Ligue 2 players
French football managers
RC Strasbourg Alsace managers
Standard Liège managers
Racing Club de France Football managers
Footballers from Strasbourg